Kalju Karask (28 March 1931 Rakke – 11 August 2011 Tallinn) was an Estonian opera and operetta singer (tenor) and actor.

In 1953 he graduated from GITIS' Estonian studio. 1953-1959 he worked at Estonian Drama Theatre, and 1959-1994 at Estonia Theatre.

Awards
 1978: Meritorious Artist of the Estonian SSR
 1998: Georg Ots prize
 2001: Order of the White Star, V class.

Opera roles

 Tõnisson (Luts' and H. Luik's "Kevade", 1954)
 Timo (Kivi's and Panso's "Seitse venda", 1956)
 Aavo Koskel (Lall Kahas' "Pähklimägi", 1956)

Filmography
 Andruse õnn (1955)
 Näitleja Joller (1960)
 Põrgupõhja uus Vanapagan (1964)
 Mäeküla piimamees (1965)
 Keskpäevane praam (1967)
 Mehed ei nuta (1968)

References

1931 births
2011 deaths
20th-century Estonian male opera singers
Estonian male musical theatre actors
20th-century Estonian male actors
Recipients of the Order of the White Star, 5th Class
Estonian male film actors
People from Väike-Maarja Parish
Estonian tenors